Ed Williamson (born 31 March 1984 in Teesside, England) is a professional contemporary artist and former professional rugby union player.  He retired in 2016 after playing for Union Athletic Libournaise.  Williamson started his career with Newcastle Falcons who he had played for since the age of 18. He made his first team debut in the 2004/2005 season against Leicester Tigers. He went on to play over 80 games for the club. He has represented England at the U19 level.

Following a serious injury to his hand in an A League game for Falcons against Northampton Saints, Williamson was forced into retirement at the end of the 2010/2011 season.  However, with the support of the Rugby Players Association (RPA) and further surgery, Williamson was miraculously able to return to rugby in February 2012 for Leeds Carnegie where he put in several man of the match performances.

At the start of the 2012/13, season he reentered the Premiership with the newly promoted London Welsh RFC[2]

He joined Rotherham Titans as a player and as forwards coach ahead of the 2013/14 season. It was to be an impressive season for the club, finishing 4th in the league, reaching the playoffs and also the knockout stages of the B&I cup for the 1st time in Rotherham's history. Williamson played a big part and received heavy praise for his defensive work with the team, including some impressive performances on the field.

Williamson played for French Federàl 1 side UA Libournaise for the 14/15 and 15/16 seasons.

He is now a professional contemporary artist, still living and working in Dublin, Ireland .  He has exhibited his work around the world, including in major shows in New York, Miami and Monaco.  His work can be viewed on his website www.edwilliamsonart.com or on his Instagram @williamsonartofficial.  Ed is heavily involved in charity, and regularly donates his time and his paintings to a selection of charitable foundations.

Ed is the son of Jack Williamson, a local revolutionary political activist in the North East. He is also the nephew of Richard Marshall, a local artist. Williamson is father to three children. He is married to Beverley Williamson who is a Competition Law academic.

References

http://www.chroniclelive.co.uk/sport/rugby-news/newcastle-falcons/2012/01/26/miracle-man-ed-williamson-is-back-in-action-72703-30202103/ https://web.archive.org/web/20120709022037/http://www.london-welsh.co.uk/rugby_newsroom_article.asp?id=1261

http://www.thejournal.co.uk/sport/rugby-union/ex-newcastle-falcon-ed-williamson-rotherham-7133583

http://www.therugbypaper.co.uk/featured-post/6571/exile-ed-williamson-brushes-up-for-life-after-rugby/

http://www.rugbydump.com/2013/02/3008/alfie-tooala-superman-tackle-and-ed-williamson-flying-clearout

External links
Newcastle Falcons profile

1984 births
Living people
London Welsh RFC players
People educated at Barnard Castle School
Rugby union flankers
Rugby union number eights
Rugby union players from County Durham